The 2021–22 season was the 115th season in the existence of Venezia F.C. and the club's first season back in the top flight of Italian football since 2001–02. In addition to the domestic league, Venezia participated in this season's edition of the Coppa Italia.

Players

First-team squad

Other players under contract
Include players not registered for current season.

Out on loan

Transfers

In

Pre-season and friendlies

Competitions

Overall record

Serie A

League table

Results summary

Results by round

Matches
The league fixtures were announced on 14 July 2021.

Coppa Italia

Statistics

Appearances and goals

|-
! colspan=14 style=background:#DCDCDC; text-align:center| Goalkeepers

|-
! colspan=14 style=background:#DCDCDC; text-align:center| Defenders

|-
! colspan=14 style=background:#DCDCDC;  text-align:center| Midfielders

|-
! colspan=14 style=background:#DCDCDC; text-align:center| Forwards

|-
! colspan=14 style=background:#DCDCDC; text-align:center| Player transferred out during the season

|-

Notes

References

Venezia F.C. seasons
Venezia